Alan Paul Anderson is a former Commissioner for the Federal Maritime Commission of the United States. He was nominated by President George W. Bush on April 11, 2003.  On May 5, 2004, he was confirmed by the United States Senate and was sworn in on June 30, 2004.

Before becoming Commissioner for the Federal Maritime Commission, Anderson was the Vice President of JM Family Enterprises. Prior to that he was the Director of Public Affairs to Port Everglades.

Education
Anderson attended the University of Florida, and he received his bachelor's degree in 1982.  He also completed a graduate program at Harvard University, where he specialized in Government.

References

External links
Commissioner A. Paul Anderson

1961 births
Living people
People from Florida
Florida Republicans
University of Florida alumni
Harvard Graduate School of Arts and Sciences alumni
Federal Maritime Commission members
George W. Bush administration personnel